Bartolomeo Bassi (early 1600s (decade)-1640s) was an Italian painter active in the early-Baroque period, mainly in his hometown of Genoa. He was a disciple of Giovanni Andrea Ansaldo, and painted quadratura. Died at the age of 40.

References

1600s births
1640s deaths
17th-century Italian painters
Italian male painters
Painters from Genoa
Italian Baroque painters
Quadratura painters